Philip de Lalaing was the name of three noblemen who were politically influential in the 16th-century Low Countries:

 Philip de Lalaing, 2nd Count of Hoogstraten (died after 1555), Governor of Guelders
 Philip de Lalaing, Lord of La Mouillerie (1499–1550), Master of the Household to Margaret of Austria
 Philip de Lalaing, 3rd Count of Lalaing  (1537–1582), Governor of Hainaut